Tyler Faraz Niknam (born December 20, 1990), better known as Trainwreckstv or Trainwreck, is an American Twitch streamer.

Early life
Niknam was raised in Scottsdale, Arizona. He went to Chaparral High School. He is of Iranian descent. He graduated from Arizona State University in 2014, earning a bachelor's degree in analytic philosophy.

Career
Niknam began streaming gaming and IRL content in 2015. 

In November 2017, Niknam received a 5-day ban from Twitch after he went on a rant where he referred to several female streamers as "sluts" and accused them of stealing views from those who he viewed as more deserving streamers. In an interview with Kotaku, Niknam stated that the rant was directed towards "the 0.1 percent [of women] that sexually exploit themselves for views and money and hide behind the defense or veil of sexism." He also stated that the rant was partially meant to be interpreted in a satirical manner. He later released an apology via Twitter. In October 2018, Niknam received an indefinite ban from Twitch after he said during an Overwatch stream, that women normally play support classes and when they switch to a DPS class they bring down the team and throw games.

In April 2019, Niknam debuted the "Scuffed Podcast" where he and several other internet personalities discuss a variety of topics.

In late 2020, Niknam began streaming Among Us and quickly gained popularity for his style of play. On October 6, he won a Code Red Among Us Tournament, taking home the grand prize of $5,000 USD. Digital Trends named Niknam as one of the best Among Us players on Twitch.

Niknam was the second most watched Twitch streamer during the 2020 United States Presidential Election, hitting 607,000 hours watched on election night (18.2% of total hours watched across Twitch). Fellow streamers Hasan Piker and Mizkif ranked at numbers one and three, respectively.

In June 2021, Niknam moved to Canada to continue his online gambling streams and to evade U.S cryptocurrency tax laws. Streamers gambling on Twitch were criticized due to the alleged harmful influence that they may have on underage viewers. Niknam continued his gambling streams despite the criticisms. Large wins on his streams are typically followed by the broadcast of a message of discouragement towards gambling by Niknam.

In 2021, Niknam was the second highest earning slot streamer on Twitch. In October 2022, Niknam claimed to have been paid US$360 million by sponsors to gamble on stream over a 16 month period.

Philanthropy
Niknam has used the Scuffed Podcast as a way of raising funds for charitable causes. In January 2020, he raised $41,109 AUD for the World Wide Fund for Nature Australia to support wildfire relief after the 2019–20 Australian bushfire season. In June 2020, Niknam raised $35,000 USD for civil rights advocacy group Color of Change.

References

1990 births
Living people
People from Scottsdale, Arizona
Arizona State University alumni
People from Austin, Texas
Twitch (service) streamers
American podcasters
American people of Iranian descent
American gamblers